Trupanea candida is a species of tephritid or fruit flies in the genus Pliomelaena of the family Tephritidae.

Distribution
Argentina.

References

Tephritinae
Insects described in 1942
Diptera of South America